Julie Joell Gregory (born May 16, 1969 in Columbus, Ohio) is an American author of Sickened: The Memoir of a Munchausen by Proxy Childhood, an autobiographical account of the Münchausen syndrome by proxy abuse she suffered as a child.

Personal history
According to Sickened, Gregory's mother frequently took her to various doctors, coaching her to act sicker than she was and exaggerating her symptoms, and demanding increasingly invasive procedures to diagnose the girl's imaginary illnesses. At home, her mother fed Gregory a diet based on foods a doctor had said Gregory should not have, administered prescription medicine erratically, sometimes in double doses, and filled her days with strenuous physical labor. According to Gregory, her mother even became upset when one doctor would not perform open heart surgery on her daughter. Also, in the book, Gregory mentions being told by her mother that matches were safe to eat.

When Gregory finally realized what her mother was doing to her, she attempted to tell several people about the situation, but those she told either expressed disbelief or paid no attention. Only upon telling her work counselor, a professional bound to disclose allegations of abuse to authorities, was the abusive behavior of her parents finally realized by others.

In addition, My Father's Keeper recounts allegations of physical and emotional abuse inflicted by Gregory's father.

Film appearances
Julie Gregory starred in the film I Didn’t Think You Didn’t Know I Wasn’t Dead  and My New Advisor by Columbus, Ohio, independent filmmaker Jim Bihari.

External links
archived version of Gregory's website

1969 births
Living people
Writers from Columbus, Ohio
21st-century American memoirists
American women memoirists
Factitious disorders
21st-century American women writers